Boda is a town located in the Central African Republic prefecture of Lobaye.

History 
On 29 January 2014 Anti-balaka took control of Boda following Seleka withdrawal.  In September 2016 Boda was declared to be free from rebel groups. In August 2017 it was reported that the town was under control of security forces following withdrawal of international forces three months before. On 18 December 2020 Boda was captured by rebels from Coalition of Patriots for Change. It was recaptured by government forces on 24 January 2021.

References 

Sub-prefectures of the Central African Republic
Populated places in Lobaye